Elijah Kellogg, Jr. (May 20, 1813 – March 17, 1901) was an American Congregationalist minister, lecturer and author of popular boy's adventure books.

Professional life 
Born in Portland, Maine, Kellogg was the son of a minister and missionary to local Native Americans. He graduated from Bowdoin College in 1840 and Andover Theological Seminary. Kellogg served as a minister of the church in Harpswell, Maine 1844–54, as chaplain of the Boston Seaman's Friend Society and pastor of the Mariners' Church of Boston 1855–1865; and ended his life as minister of the church in Topsham, Maine from 1871 until his death in 1901.

Family and heritage 
Kellogg married Hannah Pearson Pomeroy and had three sons and one daughter. Wilmot B. Mitchell of Bowdoin edited Elijah Kellogg, the Man and His Work: Chapters From His Life and Selections from His Writings (Boston: Lee and Shepard, 1903). Bowdoin College offers an online collection guide to Kellogg's personal papers and those of his father (who was a trustee of Bowdoin). Elijah Kellogg Church, Congregational in Harpswell, Maine (where he served as pastor) is now named for him.

Writing 
Kellogg began writing children's books in the 1860s, and was highly productive. While he is best known to students of rhetoric as the author of the once-popular monologue "Spartacus to the Gladiators at Capua" (written for a student competition while he was still an undergraduate at Bowdoin), he later produced several series of books. These include:

Elm Island Series 
 Lion Ben of Elm Island (1868)
 Charlie Bell: The Waif of Elm Island (1868, copyright renewed 1896)
 The Ark of Elm Island (1869)
 The Boy Farmers of Elm Island (1869)
 The Young Ship-Builders of Elm Island (1870)
 The Hard-Scrabble of Elm Island (1870)

Pleasant Cove Series 
 Arthur Brown: The Young Captain (1870)
 The Young Deliverers of Pleasant Cove (1871)
 The Cruise of the Casco (1871)
 The Child of the Island Glen (1872)
 John Godsoe's Legacy (1873)
 The Fisher Boys of Pleasant Cove (1874)

Whispering Pine Series 
(Set at Bowdoin College, his alma mater, of which his father was later a trustee.)
 The Spark of Genius; or, The College Life of James Trafton (1871)
 The Sophomores of Radcliffe; or, James Trafton and His Bosom Friends (1871)
 The Whispering Pine; or, the Graduates of Radcliffe Hall (1872)
 Winning His Spurs; or, Henry Morton's First Trial (1872)
 The Turning of the Tide; or, Radcliffe Rich and His Patients (1873)
 A Stout Heart; or, the Student From Over the Sea (1873)

Forest Glen Series 
 Saved By the Wind; or, The Poor Boy's Future (1874)
 Wolf Run; or, the Boys of the Wilderness (1875)
 Brought to the Front; or, The Young Defenders (1875)
 The Mission of Black Rifle; or, On the Trail (1876)
 Forest Glen; or, the Mohawk's Friendship (1877)
 Burying the Hatchet; or, the Young Brave of the Delawares (1878)

Good Old Times Series 
 Good Old Times; or, Grandfather's Struggle for a Homestead (1877, rev. 1905)
 A Strong Arm and a Mother's Blessing (1880)
 The Unseen Hand; or, James Renfew and His Boy Helpers (1881)
 The Live Oak Boys; or, The Adventures of Richard Constable Afloat and Shore (1882)

Stand-alone books 
 Norman Cline (1869)

References

External links

 

1813 births
1901 deaths
19th-century Congregationalist ministers
American chaplains
American Congregationalist ministers
People from Harpswell, Maine
Writers from Portland, Maine
People from Topsham, Maine
Burials at Western Cemetery (Portland, Maine)
Congregationalist missionaries in the United States
19th-century American clergy